Texas State Teachers Association, or TSTA, is the oldest education organization in Texas, affiliated with the National Education Association (NEA). TSTA is led by a full-time state president and vice president, a Board of Directors, and a democratically elected House of Delegates.

Mission 
TSTA's mission is to "unite, organize and empower public education advocates to shape public education in Texas, thus providing a quality public school for every child."

History 
TSTA originated in Mexia in June 1880, when the North Texas Teachers Association and Austin Teachers Association combined. Among its many achievements: minimum foundation laws that set statewide teacher salaries; creation of the Teacher Retirement System of Texas; certification laws; bills to establish maintenance and operation funds for schools; and thousands of other important bills. By an all-member vote in 1974, TSTA unified with the National Education Association, which is based in Washington, D.C.

References

External links 
 Texas State Teachers Association 
 Texas State Historical Association

National Education Association
Trade unions established in 1880
Organizations based in Austin, Texas
Education in Texas